The Association of Internet Researchers (AoIR) is a learned society dedicated to the advancement of the transdisciplinary field of Internet studies. Founded in 1999, it is an international, member-based support network promoting critical and scholarly Internet research, independent from traditional disciplines and existing across academic borders.

AoIR was formally founded on May 30, 1999, at a meeting of nearly sixty scholars at the San Francisco Hilton and Towers, following initial discussions at a 1998 conference at Drake University entitled "The World Wide Web and Contemporary Cultural Theory: Metaphor, Magic & Power". As the Chronicle of Higher Education noted, its rapid growth during the first few years of its existence marked the coming of age of Internet studies. It has continued to grow, with a membership of approximately 400 scholars. It supports AIR-L, a mailing list with over 5,000 subscribers.

AoIR holds an annual academic conference, as well as promoting online discussion and collaboration through a long-running mailing list, and other venues.

Activities
The Association supports scholarly communication in a number of ways:
 It organizes an annual, peer-reviewed scholarly conference, which accepts paper and presentation submissions from all disciplines.
 As part of its annual conference, it hosts an annual one day interdisciplinary Doctoral Colloquium for Ph.D. students and an Early Career Researchers event for professionals who are in their first academic positions following the completion of the Ph.D.  
 It hosts the AIR-L mailing list with over 5000 subscribers.
 It has published multiple editions of the Internet Research Annual with Peter Lang
 It hosts working groups that produce reports of interest to researchers in the field, most notably the AoIR Guide on Ethical Online Research.
 It co-sponsors an annual issue of the journal Information, Communication and Society consisting of top papers from the annual conference.
 It publishes Selected Papers of Internet Research (SPIR), an open access online collection of papers presented at the annual conference 
 It curates videos of its keynote and some of its other speakers on its YouTube page.

Conferences 
 2022 - AoIR 2022: Decolonising the Internet, Dublin, Ireland
 2021 - AoIR 2021: Independence (online) 
 2020 - AoIR 2020: Life (online)
 2019 - AoIR 2019: Trust in the System, Brisbane, Australia
 2018 - AoIR 2018: Transnational Materialities, Montreal, Canada
 2017 - AoIR 2017: Networked Publics, Tartu and Tallinn, Estonia
 2016 - AoIR 2016: Internet Rules! Berlin, Germany
 2015 - Internet Research 16: Digital Imaginaries, Phoenix, United States
 2014 - Internet Research 15: Boundaries and Intersections, Daegu, South Korea
 2013 – Internet Research 14: Resistance + Appropriation, Denver, United States
 2012 – Internet Research 13: Technologies, Salford, United Kingdom
 2011 – Internet Research 12: Performance and Participation, Seattle, United States
 2010 – Internet Research 11: Sustainability, Participation, Action, Gothenburg, Sweden
 2009 – Internet Research 10: Internet: Critical, Milwaukee, United States
 2008 – Internet Research 9: Rethinking Communities, Rethinking Place, Copenhagen, Denmark
 2007 – Internet Research 8: Let's Play!, Vancouver, Canada
 2006 – Internet Research 7: Internet Convergences, Brisbane, Australia
 2005 – Internet Research 6: Internet Generations, Chicago, United States
 2004 – Internet Research 5: Ubiquity?, Brighton, England
 2003 – Internet Research 4: Broadening the Band, Toronto, Canada
 2002 – Internet Research 3: Net/Work/Theory, Maastricht, Netherlands
 2001 – Internet Research 2: InterConnections, Minneapolis, United States
 2000 – Internet Research 1: The State of the Interdiscipline, Lawrence, United States

Presidents

References

External links
 AoIR Web Site
 Air-L, the AoIR listserv
 Ethical decision-making and Internet research: Recommendations from the AoIR ethics working committee

Organizations established in 1999
Internet-related organizations
1999 establishments in the United States